Botany is a monthly peer-reviewed scientific journal that is published by Canadian Science Publishing. It was established in 1935 as the Canadian Journal of Research, Section C: Botanical Sciences and renamed in 1951 as Canadian Journal of Botany. It covers research on all aspects of botany.

The journal was selected as one of the DBIO 100, the 100 most influential journals in biology and medicine over the last 100 years, as voted by the BioMedical & Life Sciences Division of the Special Libraries Association on the occasion of its centennial.

The editors-in-chief are Christian R. Lacroix (University of Prince Edward Island) and Liette Vasseur 'Brock University).

References

External links 
 
 Botany/Canadian Journal of Botany at HathiTrust Digital Library
 Botany/Canadian Journal of Botany at Botanical Scientific Journals

Monthly journals
Botany journals
Canadian Science Publishing academic journals
Multilingual journals
Publications established in 1935